Gordon Kennedy may refer to:

 Gordon Kennedy (musician) (born 1959), rock musician from the United States
 Gordon Kennedy (actor) (born 1958), Scottish actor